Cory Steven Jane (born 8 February 1983) is a New Zealand international rugby union player.

He first played for the All Blacks in 2008 and plays as a winger. In 2011 Jane was selected into the Tri Nations team as injury cover. A few weeks later he made the Rugby World Cup squad of 30 after tight competition in the back three.

Career 
Born in Lower Hutt, New Zealand, Jane played for Wellington in the Mitre 10 Cup and for the Wellington Hurricanes in Super Rugby.  He has previously played for Hawke's Bay and was in the New Zealand team that won the Rugby Sevens gold medal at the 2006 Commonwealth Games. Of Ngāti Kahungunu descent, Jane represented New Zealand Māori in 2006.

Jane was third-equal on the 2006 Air New Zealand Cup leading try scorer's list with 6 tries, behind Richard Kahui (8 tries) and Sitiveni Sivivatu (7 tries), both from Waikato.

He was a member of the 2011 Rugby World Cup winning All Blacks. A few days before New Zealand's quarter-final game against Argentina, Jane and fellow All Black Israel Dagg were found "acting curiously" at a Takapuna bar after having a competition between themselves to see who could stay awake the longest after taking sleeping pills.

In 2012 he played on the wing for the Hurricanes. He was not included in the 2012 All Blacks team for the series against Ireland due to injury, but was selected again for 2012 Rugby Championship and was part of the side that beat Australia in the first two tests of the Bledisloe Cup. Jane also played in the All Blacks for 2012 End-of-Year Tour, in which they beat Scotland, Wales and Italy.

Jane suffered a serious leg injury in January 2013, preventing his involvement in Super Rugby and the series against France held in June. In October 2013, he was recalled into the All Blacks team after two games for Wellington in the ITM Cup. He was later named on the right wing in the Final Bledisloe Cup match. but ruled out on the 11th hour due to an injury and subsequently replaced by Charles Piutau. He was added to the All Blacks squad for the 2013 end-of-year rugby union tests. He returned to international rugby after being named on the right wing against France.

Jane narrowly missed out on being picked for New Zealand's 2015 Rugby World Cup squad.

References

External links 
 
 Hurricanes profile
 
 Statistics from Fox Sports
 
 
 

1983 births
Living people
Commonwealth Games gold medallists for New Zealand
New Zealand international rugby union players
New Zealand rugby union players
Hurricanes (rugby union) players
Wellington rugby union players
Sportspeople from Upper Hutt
Rugby sevens players at the 2006 Commonwealth Games
New Zealand male rugby sevens players
Rugby union wings
Rugby union fullbacks
Ngāti Kahungunu people
Māori All Blacks players
People educated at Heretaunga College
New Zealand international rugby sevens players
Commonwealth Games rugby sevens players of New Zealand
Toshiba Brave Lupus Tokyo players
New Zealand expatriate rugby union players
Expatriate rugby union players in Japan
New Zealand expatriate sportspeople in Japan
Commonwealth Games medallists in rugby sevens
Medallists at the 2006 Commonwealth Games